Markland College is a school in Oudenbosch and Zevenbergen, Netherlands. It is located in Pagnevaartweg 5, 4731 AA, Pagnevaartweg 7, 4731 AA
and Eikenlaan 18, 4731 CR in Oudenbosch. It also located in Gildelaan 82, 4761 BA in Zevenbergen.

References

Secondary schools in the Netherlands
Schools in North Brabant
Halderberge
Moerdijk